Channel 11 or TV11 may refer to:

 TV11 (Sweden), a Swedish conditional access entertainment channel
 Eleven (Australian TV channel), an Australian free-to-air digital television channel
 Canal Once (Mexico), a Mexican educational broadcast television network assigned virtual channel 11 nationwide
 Chilevisión, formerly Teleonce, a television station in Chile
 La Tele (Paraguayan TV channel), formerly Hispanoamerica Televisión, a Paraguayan privately television channel
 Munhwa Broadcasting Corporation, South Korean television and radio network whose flagship station is Channel 11
 RBC Televisión, a Peruvian free-to-air television channel
 Señal Colombia, formerly Canal 11, a Colombian national television channel
 Telefe, formerly Canal Once, a state-run network in Argentina
 TVU (Chile), an educational television station in Concepción, Chile
 DZOE-TV Channel 11, in Metro Manila, Philippines
 TDT (TV station), a television station in Tasmania, Australia
In Vietmam
TTV11, a Television station in Tay Ninh province
TV11, a Television station in Tra Vinh province
AFVN, a television station operated by the United States Military as the American Forces Vietnam Network broadcasting on Channel 11 in the South Vietnamese capital of Saigon from 1962 until the Fall of Saigon on April 30, 1975.

See also
 Television in Lithuania
 Channel 11 branded TV stations in the United States
 Channel 11 virtual TV stations in Canada
 Channel 11 virtual TV stations in the United States
For VHF frequencies covering 198-204 MHz:
 Channel 11 TV stations in Canada
 Channel 11 TV stations in Mexico
 Channel 11 digital TV stations in the United States
 Channel 11 low-power TV stations in the United States

11